This is a list of 749 species in Anthonomus, a genus of true weevils in the family Curculionidae.

Anthonomus species

 Anthonomus abdominalis Schenkling, S. & Marshall G.A.K., 1934 c
 Anthonomus accola Clark, 1990 c
 Anthonomus acerolae Clark, 1988 c
 Anthonomus acus Clark, 1990 c
 Anthonomus adnexus Burke, 1988 i c
 Anthonomus aegrotus Clark in Clark & Burke, 1996 c
 Anthonomus aeneolus Dietz, 1891 i c b
 Anthonomus aeneotinctus Champion, G.C., 1903 c
 Anthonomus aereus Champion, G.C., 1903 c
 Anthonomus aeroides Clark, 1990 c
 Anthonomus aestuans (Fabricius, J.C., 1792) c g
 Anthonomus affinis LeConte, J.L., 1896 c
 Anthonomus agamus Clark, 1988 c
 Anthonomus agerochus Clark, 1991 c
 Anthonomus agresi Clark, 1990 c
 Anthonomus aguilari Ferragu, 1964 c
 Anthonomus aino Kôno, 1939 c
 Anthonomus albitus Clark in Clark & Burke, 1996 c
 Anthonomus alboannulatus Boheman, 1843 c
 Anthonomus albocapitis Clark, 1991 c
 Anthonomus albocivitensis Clark, 1993 c
 Anthonomus albolineatus Champion, G.C., 1903 c
 Anthonomus albomaculatus Kôno, 1939 c
 Anthonomus albopictus Champion, G.C., 1903 c
 Anthonomus albopilosus Dietz, 1891 i c b
 Anthonomus albopunctatus Voss, 1941 c
 Anthonomus alboscutellatus Champion, 1903 i c
 Anthonomus albus Hatch, 1971 i g
 Anthonomus alni Kojima & Morimoto, 1994 c
 Anthonomus altamnis Clark, 1988 c
 Anthonomus alternans Champion, G.C., 1903 c
 Anthonomus amaguensis Cockerell, T.D.A., 1925 c g
 Anthonomus amari Clark, 1990 c
 Anthonomus ambiguus Clark, 1990 c
 Anthonomus amygdali Hustache, 1930 c
 Anthonomus ancepitis Clark, 1990 c
 Anthonomus anenius Clark, 1991 c
 Anthonomus annulipes Fischer, 1888 c
 Anthonomus anomalops Clark, 1989 c
 Anthonomus anthracinus Boheman, 1843 c
 Anthonomus antirrhini Billberg, 1820 c
 Anthonomus apertus Fall, 1901 i c
 Anthonomus aphanostephi Pierce, W.D., 1908 c
 Anthonomus apionoides Clark, 1990 c
 Anthonomus appositus Fall, 1913 i c b
 Anthonomus aptus Clark & Burke, 1985 c
 Anthonomus araucanus Clark, 1989 c
 Anthonomus arenicolor  c b
 Anthonomus argentatus Gyllenhal, 1835 c
 Anthonomus argentinensis Hustache, 1939 c
 Anthonomus argocephale Clark, 1991 c
 Anthonomus aristus Suffrian, E., 1871 c
 Anthonomus armicrus Fairmaire, L., 1897 c
 Anthonomus arrogans Clark, 1991 c
 Anthonomus ater LeConte, 1876 i c b
 Anthonomus aterrimus Champion, G.C., 1903 c
 Anthonomus atomarius Blatchley, 1916 i c
 Anthonomus auctoratis Clark, 1992 c
 Anthonomus australis Boisduval, 1835 c
 Anthonomus avarus Germar, 1817 c
 Anthonomus avidus Faust, J., 1893 c
 Anthonomus azalus Clark, 1990 c
 Anthonomus babai Morimoto & Kojima, 1994 c
 Anthonomus baccharidis Pierce, W.D., 1908 c
 Anthonomus bajaensis Clark & Burke, 2005 c
 Anthonomus bardus Clark in Clark & Burke, 1996 c
 Anthonomus baridioides Champion, G.C., 1903 c
 Anthonomus basalis Kirsch, T., 1874 c
 Anthonomus basidens Fall, 1913 c
 Anthonomus baudueri Desbrochers, J., 1875 c
 Anthonomus bavarus Schenkling, S. & Marshall G.A.K., 1934 c
 Anthonomus beccus Clark & Burke, 1985 c
 Anthonomus bechynei Voss, 1956 c
 Anthonomus bechyneorum Clark, 1987 c
 Anthonomus behnei Kostal, 2014 c g
 Anthonomus bellus Clark, 1990 c
 Anthonomus belti Clark, 1988 c
 Anthonomus berberidis Clark, 1989 c
 Anthonomus bicorostris Blatchley, 1925 i c
 Anthonomus bidentatus Boheman, 1843 c
 Anthonomus bifasciatus Matsumura, c
 Anthonomus bifidus Burke, 1962 c
 Anthonomus bimaculatus Hustache, 1930 c
 Anthonomus biplagiatus Redtenbacher, L., 1868 c
 Anthonomus bisignatus Gyllenhal, 1835 c
 Anthonomus bisignifer Schenkling, S. & Marshall G.A.K., 1934 c
 Anthonomus bisinuatus Burke & Cross, 1966 c
 Anthonomus bituberculatus Thomson, C.G., 1868 c
 Anthonomus blanchardi Clark, 1989 c
 Anthonomus blatchleyi Schenkling, S. & Marshall G.A.K., 1934 c
 Anthonomus blik Clark, 1994 c
 Anthonomus bohemani Clark & Burke, 1985 c
 Anthonomus bolteri Dietz, 1891 i c
 Anthonomus bondari Clark, 1992 c
 Anthonomus bonvouloiri Desbrochers, J., 1868 c
 Anthonomus bordoni Clark, 1987 c
 Anthonomus brachyrhinus Anderson, 1994 c
 Anthonomus brasiliensis Clark, 1992 c
 Anthonomus brenthus Clark, 1991 c
 Anthonomus brevipennis Clark, 1993 c
 Anthonomus brevirostris Linell, M.L., 1897 c
 Anthonomus brevispinus Pic, M., 1902 c
 Anthonomus britannus Desbrochers, J., 1868 c
 Anthonomus bruchi Hustache, 1939 c
 Anthonomus brunneipennis Curtis, J., 1840 c
 Anthonomus brunnipennis Mannerheim, 1843 i c
 Anthonomus cacerensis Clark, 1988 c
 Anthonomus cacuminis Clark, 1993 c
 Anthonomus caeruleus Champion, G.C., 1903 c
 Anthonomus caerulisquamis Champion, G.C., 1903 c
 Anthonomus caesius Clark, 1990 c
 Anthonomus calceatus Say, 1831 c
 Anthonomus californiensis Clark & Burke, 2005 c
 Anthonomus callirrhoe Pierce, W.D., 1908 c
 Anthonomus callosus Faust, J., 1893 c
 Anthonomus calvescens Schenkling, S., 1934 c
 Anthonomus camerunensis Schenkling, S. & Marshall G.A.K., 1934 c
 Anthonomus camoiranensis Clark, 1987 c
 Anthonomus campinas Marshall, 1938 c
 Anthonomus canaliculatus Schenkling, S., 1934 c
 Anthonomus canescens Champion, G.C., 1903 c
 Anthonomus canoides Clark & Burke, 2001 c
 Anthonomus canus LeConte, J.L., 1876 c
 Anthonomus capensis Boheman, 1843 c
 Anthonomus captivus Clark, 1988 c
 Anthonomus caracasius Faust, J., 1893 c
 Anthonomus carbonarius Dejean, c
 Anthonomus carnifex Clark, 1993 c
 Anthonomus catocha Clark in Clark & Burke, 1996 c
 Anthonomus cavei Clark in Clark & Burke, 1993 c
 Anthonomus challtonii Clark, 1990 c
 Anthonomus championi Clark & Burke, 1985 c
 Anthonomus chaos Clark, 1991 c
 Anthonomus chernatris Clark, 1988 c
 Anthonomus chevrolati Desbrochers, J., 1868 c
 Anthonomus chilensis Schenkling, S. & Marshall G.A.K., 1934 c
 Anthonomus chilicola Clark, 1989 c
 Anthonomus chinculticensis Clark, 1987 c
 Anthonomus ciccus Clark, 1993 c
 Anthonomus ciliaticollis Champion, 1910 c
 Anthonomus cinctus Thomson, C.G., 1865 c
 Anthonomus cinereus Schenkling, S. & Marshall G.A.K., 1934 c
 Anthonomus clavatus Dejean, 1821 c
 Anthonomus coactus Clark, 1992 c
 Anthonomus cognatus Burke, 1964 i c
 Anthonomus collinus Billberg, 1820 c
 Anthonomus comari Crotch, G.R., 1869 c
 Anthonomus comatosus Clark in Clark & Burke, 1996 c
 Anthonomus commutatus Dieckmann, 1975 c
 Anthonomus comparabilis Clark, 1990 c
 Anthonomus concinnus Dietz, 1891 i c
 Anthonomus concubius Clark in Clark & Burke, 1996 c
 Anthonomus confusus Dietz, 1891 i c
 Anthonomus connexus Dieckmann, 1968 c
 Anthonomus consimilis Dietz, 1891 i c
 Anthonomus consors (Dietz, 1891) i b  (cherry curculio)
 Anthonomus conspersus Desbrochers, J., 1868 c
 Anthonomus constrictus Hustache, 1939 c
 Anthonomus contaminatus Boheman, 1843 c
 Anthonomus convexicollis Gyllenhal, 1835 c
 Anthonomus convexifrons Hustache, 1930 c
 Anthonomus convexipennis Clark, 1993 c
 Anthonomus convictus Gates, 1972 i c b
 Anthonomus corvulus LeConte, 1876 i c b
 Anthonomus cossonoides Schenkling, S. & Marshall G.A.K., 1934 c
 Anthonomus costipennis Fairmaire, L., 1889 c
 Anthonomus costulatus Suffrian, 1871 i c
 Anthonomus coyamensis Clark, 1988 c
 Anthonomus crataegi Walsh, 1866 c
 Anthonomus crenatus Champion, G.C., 1903 c
 Anthonomus cretaceus Clark, 1990 c
 Anthonomus cribratellus Reitter, 1915 c
 Anthonomus cristatus Schenkling, S. & Marshall G.A.K., 1934 c
 Anthonomus curtulus Desbrochers, J., 1892 c
 Anthonomus curtus Faust, J., 1882 c
 Anthonomus curvicrus Clark, 1990 c
 Anthonomus curvirostris Schenkling, S. & Marshall G.A.K., 1934 c
 Anthonomus cuyaguensis Clark, 1988 c
 Anthonomus cyaneus Champion, G.C., 1903 c
 Anthonomus cyanicolor Gyllenhal, 1835 c
 Anthonomus cyanipennis Champion, G.C., 1903 c
 Anthonomus cycliferus Fall, 1913 i c
 Anthonomus cylindricollis Blatchley, 1916 i c
 Anthonomus cymatilis Clark, 1990 c
 Anthonomus cyprius Marshall, 1925 c
 Anthonomus czekanowskii Ter-Minasian, 1936 c
 Anthonomus dealbatus Champion, 1910 c
 Anthonomus debilis Blatchley, 1916 i c
 Anthonomus deceptus Sleeper, 1955 i c
 Anthonomus decipiens LeConte, 1876 i c b
 Anthonomus defossus Scudder, S.H., 1876 c g
 Anthonomus deliqulus Clark & Burke, 1985 c
 Anthonomus dentatus Dejean, 1821 c
 Anthonomus denticrus Clark, 1994 c
 Anthonomus denticulatus Clark, 1989 c
 Anthonomus dentipennis Chevrolat, L.A.A., 1876 c
 Anthonomus dentipes Hustache, 1940 c
 Anthonomus dentoni Angell, 1893 i c b
 Anthonomus desbrochersi Faust, J., 1890 c
 Anthonomus deserticolus Clark & Burke, 2005 c
 Anthonomus diamantinaensis Clark, 1987 c
 Anthonomus dicionis Clark, 1992 c
 Anthonomus differens Hustache, 1930 c
 Anthonomus dilutus Reitter, 1915 c
 Anthonomus discoidalis Tournier, H., 1873 c
 Anthonomus disjunctus LeConte, 1876 i c b
 Anthonomus dissimilis Dietz, 1891 c
 Anthonomus distigma Champion, G.C., 1903 c
 Anthonomus distinguendus Desbrochers, J., 1868 c
 Anthonomus divisus Suffrian, E., 1871 c
 Anthonomus dogma Clark, 1994 c
 Anthonomus dormitor Clark in Clark & Burke, 1996 c
 Anthonomus dorothyae Hatch, 1971 i g
 Anthonomus dorsalis Sturm, 1826 c
 Anthonomus druparum Billberg, 1820 c
 Anthonomus dufaui Hustache, 1930 c
 Anthonomus duplus Clark, 1990 c
 Anthonomus duprezi Hoffmann, 1955 c
 Anthonomus ebenicus Dietz, 1891 c
 Anthonomus effetus Dietz, 1891 i c
 Anthonomus elatus Clark in Clark & Burke, 1996 c
 Anthonomus elegans Sturm, 1826 c
 Anthonomus elongatulus Boheman, 1843 c
 Anthonomus elongatus LeConte, 1876 i c b
 Anthonomus elutus
 Anthonomus erythropterus Say, 1831 c
 Anthonomus esse Clark, 1993 c
 Anthonomus estebani Clark & Burke, 1986 c
 Anthonomus eugenii Cano, 1894 i c b  (pepper weevil)
 Anthonomus excelsus Clark & Burke, 1985 c
 Anthonomus excultus Clark & Burke, 1985 c
 Anthonomus exiguum Clark, 1993 c
 Anthonomus existo Clark, 1993 c
 Anthonomus extensus  c b
 Anthonomus faber Dietz, 1891 i c b
 Anthonomus faillae Desbrochers, J., 1892 c
 Anthonomus fasciatus Stephens, 1829 c
 Anthonomus fastosus Clark, 1991 c
 Anthonomus faustinoi Clark & Burke, 1986 c
 Anthonomus felipae Clark & Burke, 1986 c
 Anthonomus femoratus Desbrochers, J., 1868 c
 Anthonomus ferrugineus Sturm, 1826 c
 Anthonomus figuratus Dietz, 1891 c
 Anthonomus filicornis Hustache, 1930 c
 Anthonomus filirostris Champion, 1910 c
 Anthonomus finitimus Burke, 1988 i c
 Anthonomus fischeri Blackwelder, 1947 c
 Anthonomus fissicaudus Clark, 1990 c
 Anthonomus flavescens Boheman, 1843 c
 Anthonomus flavicornis Boheman, 1843 c
 Anthonomus flavidomus Clark, 1989 c
 Anthonomus flavus Boheman, 1843 i c
 Anthonomus flexuosus Hustache, 1930 c
 Anthonomus floralis Dietz, 1891 i c
 Anthonomus foliicola Ter-Minasian, 1954 c
 Anthonomus formosus Kirsch, T., 1868 c
 Anthonomus fortunatus Clark, 1988 c
 Anthonomus fragariae Schenkling, S. & Marshall G.A.K., 1934 c
 Anthonomus fraudulentus Voss g
 Anthonomus frustratus Clark, 1987 c
 Anthonomus fulvipes Schenkling, S. & Marshall G.A.K., 1934 c
 Anthonomus fulvus LeConte, 1858 i c b  (winecup weevil)
 Anthonomus funereus Champion, G.C., 1903 c
 Anthonomus furcatus Schenkling, S. & Marshall G.A.K., 1934 c
 Anthonomus fuscipennis Clark, 1993 c
 Anthonomus fuscomaculatus Schenkling, S. & Marshall G.A.K., 1934 c
 Anthonomus fusicolor Voss, 1944 c
 Anthonomus gallinae Clark & Burke, 1986 c
 Anthonomus galphimiae Clark, 1987 c
 Anthonomus gaurus Clark, 1991 c
 Anthonomus geminus Clark, 1990 c
 Anthonomus gentilis Faust, J., 1891 c
 Anthonomus germanicus Dieckmann, 1968 c
 Anthonomus gerra Clark, 1993 c
 Anthonomus gibbicrus Clark, 1994 c
 Anthonomus gibbipennis Schenkling, S. & Marshall G.A.K., 1934 c
 Anthonomus gigas Boheman, 1843 c
 Anthonomus globosus Clark, 1990 c
 Anthonomus gracilicornis Hustache, 1940 c
 Anthonomus gracilipes Desbrochers, J., 1872 c
 Anthonomus gracilis Fall, H.C., c
 Anthonomus grandis Boheman, 1843 i c b  (boll weevil)
 Anthonomus gravatis Clark, 1992 c
 Anthonomus grilati Desbrochers, J., 1885 c
 Anthonomus griseisquamis Schenkling, S. & Marshall G.A.K., 1934 c
 Anthonomus grouvellei Desbrochers, J., 1887 c
 Anthonomus guadelupennis Hustache, A., 1929 c
 Anthonomus guadelupensis Hustache, 1930 c
 Anthonomus guanita Clark, 1990 c
 Anthonomus guerreroensis Anderson, 1994 c
 Anthonomus gularis LeConte, 1876 i c
 Anthonomus guttatus Clark, 1990 c
 Anthonomus haematopus Boheman, 1843 i c b
 Anthonomus haemorrhoidalis Sturm, 1826 c
 Anthonomus haliki Clark, 1987 c
 Anthonomus hamiltoni Dietz, 1891 c
 Anthonomus hastigerus Clark & Burke, 1985 c
 Anthonomus helianthi Fall, 1901 i c b
 Anthonomus helopioides Kolenati, F.A., 1859 c
 Anthonomus helvolus Boheman, 1843 c
 Anthonomus heterogenus Dietz, 1891 i c b
 Anthonomus heterothecae Pierce, 1908 i c b
 Anthonomus hicoriae Pierce, W.D., 1908 c
 Anthonomus hirsutus Bruner, 1888 c
 Anthonomus hirtus LeConte, 1876 i c
 Anthonomus homunculus Gyllenhal, 1835 c
 Anthonomus howdenorum Clark, 1987 c
 Anthonomus humeralis Porta, 1932 c
 Anthonomus humerosus Schenkling, S. & Marshall G.A.K., 1934 c
 Anthonomus humerulus Kojima & Idris, 2004 c
 Anthonomus hunteri Burke & Cate, 1979 c
 Anthonomus hustachi Clark, 1991 c
 Anthonomus iactationis Clark, 1991 c
 Anthonomus idea Clark, 1994 c
 Anthonomus imbifidus Clark, 1988 c
 Anthonomus imbricus Hatch, 1971 i g
 Anthonomus immolator Clark, 1993 c
 Anthonomus imperium Clark, 1992 c
 Anthonomus inaequalis Schenkling, S. & Marshall G.A.K., 1934 c
 Anthonomus inanimis Clark in Clark & Burke, 1996 c
 Anthonomus incanus Champion, G.C., 1934 c
 Anthonomus incomptus Clark, 1993 c
 Anthonomus inconcinnus Clark in Clark & Burke, 1996 c
 Anthonomus incurvus Stephens, 1831 c
 Anthonomus indolis Clark in Clark & Burke, 1996 c
 Anthonomus inermis Boheman, 1859 i c b
 Anthonomus inertis Clark in Clark & Burke, 1996 c
 Anthonomus infirmus Gyllenhal, 1835 c
 Anthonomus infletus Clark & Burke, 1985 c
 Anthonomus inobseptus Clark, 1988 c
 Anthonomus inornatus Daniel, K., 1899 c
 Anthonomus insolitus Fairmaire g
 Anthonomus instabilis Faust, J., 1893 c
 Anthonomus interfector Clark, 1993 c
 Anthonomus intermedius Clark & Burke, 2005 c
 Anthonomus interpositus Voss, 1953 c
 Anthonomus interruptus Pic, 1941 c
 Anthonomus interstitialis Dietz, 1891 i c
 Anthonomus inversus Bedel, L., 1884 c
 Anthonomus ironia Clark in Clark & Burke, 1993 c
 Anthonomus irroratus Dietz, 1891 i c
 Anthonomus isthmicus Schenkling, S. & Marshall G.A.K., 1934 c
 Anthonomus izafa Clark, 1990 c
 Anthonomus jacobianus Dietz, 1891 i g
 Anthonomus jacobinus Dietz, 1891 c b
 Anthonomus javeti Desbrochers, J., 1868 c
 Anthonomus julichi Dietz, 1891 i c
 Anthonomus juncturus Fall, 1913 c
 Anthonomus juniperi Chevrolat, 1860 c
 Anthonomus juniperinus (Sanborn, 1868) i c b
 Anthonomus kirschi Desbrochers, J., 1868 c
 Anthonomus klapperichi Voss, 1960 c
 Anthonomus koenigi Pic, 1913 c
 Anthonomus krugi Fischer, 1888 c
 Anthonomus kuscheli Clark, 1989 c
 Anthonomus languidus Gyllenhal, 1835 c
 Anthonomus laoensis Kojima, 2010 c
 Anthonomus latior Pic, M., 1902 c
 Anthonomus latiusculus Dietz, 1891 c
 Anthonomus latus Clark & Burke, 2005 c
 Anthonomus lecontei Burke, 1975 i c b
 Anthonomus leptopus Gozis, M des, 1881 c
 Anthonomus lethierryi Desbrochers, J., 1869 c
 Anthonomus leticiensis Clark, 1988 c
 Anthonomus leucocephale Clark, 1991 c
 Anthonomus leucostictus Dietz, 1891 i c b
 Anthonomus leviathan Clark, 1991 c
 Anthonomus lewinsohni Clark, 1992 c
 Anthonomus libertinus Faust, J., 1893 c
 Anthonomus ligatus Dietz, 1891 i c b
 Anthonomus ligulicollis Clark, 1993 c
 Anthonomus likensis Blatchley, 1916 i c
 Anthonomus limitaris Clark, 1988 c
 Anthonomus lineatulus Dietz, 1891 c
 Anthonomus lituratus Clark, 1990 c
 Anthonomus lomonga Clark, 1990 c
 Anthonomus longirostris Hustache, 1936 c
 Anthonomus longulus Boheman, 1843 c
 Anthonomus longurius Clark, 1993 c
 Anthonomus lugubris Clark, 1993 c
 Anthonomus luteus Suffrian, E., 1871 c
 Anthonomus macarioi Clark & Burke, 1986 c
 Anthonomus macromalus Gyllenhal, 1835 c
 Anthonomus maculatus Ter-Minasian, 1972 c
 Anthonomus major Brown, 1966 c
 Anthonomus mali Kojima & Morimoto, 1994 c
 Anthonomus malkini Hatch, 1971 i g
 Anthonomus mallyi Jones & Burke, 1997 c
 Anthonomus malpighiae Clark and Burke, 1985 i c
 Anthonomus maltanza Clark, 1988 c
 Anthonomus malvae Schenkling, S. & Marshall G.A.K., 1934 c
 Anthonomus managuensis Champion, 1910 c
 Anthonomus mandapussae Voss, 1941 c
 Anthonomus mankinsi Clark, 1988 c
 Anthonomus marialionzae Clark, 1990 c
 Anthonomus marmoratus Schenkling, S. & Marshall G.A.K., 1934 c
 Anthonomus medico Clark in Clark & Burke, 1996 c
 Anthonomus melancholicus Dietz, 1891 i g
 Anthonomus melanocephalus Germar, 1817 c
 Anthonomus melanocholicus Dietz, 1891 c
 Anthonomus melanopterus Schenkling, S. & Marshall G.A.K., 1934 c
 Anthonomus melanostictus Schenkling, S. & Marshall G.A.K., 1934 c
 Anthonomus melitoni Clark & Burke, 1986 c
 Anthonomus menor Clark, 1990 c
 Anthonomus meon Clark, 1991 c
 Anthonomus messanensis Vitale, 1903 c
 Anthonomus mexicanus Boheman, 1843 c
 Anthonomus miaephonus Pierce, 1912 i c
 Anthonomus mica Clark, 1993 c
 Anthonomus mimicanus Fall, 1913 c
 Anthonomus minor Kojima & Morimoto, 1994 c
 Anthonomus minutus Hatch, 1971 i g
 Anthonomus mirus Kirsch, T., 1868 c
 Anthonomus mixtus LeConte, J.L., 1876 c
 Anthonomus miyakawai Kojima & Morimoto, 1994 c
 Anthonomus modicellus Gyllenhal, 1835 c
 Anthonomus moleculus Casey, T.L., 1884 c
 Anthonomus molochinus Dietz, 1891 i c b
 Anthonomus mongolicus Ter-Minasian, 1972 c
 Anthonomus monostigma Schenkling, S. & Marshall G.A.K., 1934 c
 Anthonomus morbillosus Suffrian, E., 1871 c
 Anthonomus morbosus Clark in Clark & Burke, 1996 c
 Anthonomus morosus Faust, J., 1891 c
 Anthonomus morpheus Clark in Clark & Burke, 1996 c
 Anthonomus morticinus Clark
 Anthonomus morulus LeConte, 1876 i c
 Anthonomus multifasciatus Pic, 1926 c
 Anthonomus murinofasciatus Voss, 1944 c
 Anthonomus murinus Dietz, 1891 c
 Anthonomus musculus Say, 1831 i c b  (cranberry weevil)
 Anthonomus nanus Gyllenhal, 1835 c
 Anthonomus naucrum Clark, 1993 c
 Anthonomus nebulosus LeConte, 1876 i c b
 Anthonomus necrosus Clark in Clark & Burke, 1996 c
 Anthonomus neosolani O'Brien & Wibmer, 1982 c
 Anthonomus nigrinus Boheman, 1843 i c b  (potato bud weevil)
 Anthonomus nigrocapitatus Schenkling, S. & Marshall G.A.K., 1934 c
 Anthonomus nigromaculatus Schenkling, S. & Marshall G.A.K., 1934 c
 Anthonomus nigropictus Champion, G.C., 1904 c
 Anthonomus nigrovariegatus Fischer, 1888 c
 Anthonomus nihilum Clark, 1991 c
 Anthonomus nitidirostris Desbrochers, J., 1868 c
 Anthonomus nodifer Schenkling, S. & Marshall G.A.K., 1934 c
 Anthonomus nubiloides Fall, 1928 c
 Anthonomus nubilosus Clark, 1990 c
 Anthonomus nubilus LeConte, 1876 i c
 Anthonomus nullus Clark, 1991 c
 Anthonomus obesior Desbrochers, J., 1868 c
 Anthonomus obesulus Fall, 1913 i c
 Anthonomus objectum Clark, 1993 c
 Anthonomus obliquatus Hustache, 1940 c
 Anthonomus obscurus Stephens, 1829 c
 Anthonomus obsoletus Billberg, 1820 c
 Anthonomus obtrusus Fall, 1913 c
 Anthonomus obtusus Clark in Clark & Burke, 1996 c
 Anthonomus ochreopilosus Dietz, 1891 i c b
 Anthonomus ocularis Schenkling, S. & Marshall G.A.K., 1934 c
 Anthonomus oenuatti Clark, 1990 c
 Anthonomus okinawanus Kojima & Morimoto, 1994 c
 Anthonomus onerosus Clark, 1989 c
 Anthonomus ontos Clark, 1993 c
 Anthonomus opacirostris Desbrochers, J., 1868 c
 Anthonomus opinionis Clark, 1994 c
 Anthonomus opis Clark, 1992 c
 Anthonomus opous Clark, 1988 c
 Anthonomus oraapis Clark, 1988 c
 Anthonomus orchestoides Dietz, 1891 i c
 Anthonomus orichalceus Champion, G.C., 1906 c
 Anthonomus ornatulus Dietz, 1891 i c b
 Anthonomus ornatus Reiche, L., 1860 c g
 Anthonomus oscitans Clark in Clark & Burke, 1996 c
 Anthonomus ostentationis Clark, 1991 c
 Anthonomus otidocephaloides Champion, G.C., 1906 c
 Anthonomus ourateae Clark, 1993 c
 Anthonomus ousia Clark, 1993 c
 Anthonomus padi Puton in Bourgeois, 1908 c
 Anthonomus paleatus Schenkling, S. & Marshall G.A.K., 1934 c
 Anthonomus pallidulus Gyllenhal, 1835 c
 Anthonomus pallidus Dejean, 1821 c
 Anthonomus palmeri Jones & Burke, 1997 c
 Anthonomus papitrae Clark, 1990 c
 Anthonomus paradoxus Clark, 1991 c
 Anthonomus parafunereus Sleeper, 1958 c
 Anthonomus paraguayanus Hustache, 1939 c
 Anthonomus partiarius Boheman, 1843 c
 Anthonomus parvidens Schenkling, S. & Marshall G.A.K., 1934 c
 Anthonomus parvulus Blatchley, 1922 i c
 Anthonomus parvus Clark, 1993 c
 Anthonomus paulum Clark, 1993 c
 Anthonomus pauperculus LeConte, 1876 i c
 Anthonomus pauxillus Schenkling, S. & Marshall G.A.K., 1934 c
 Anthonomus pazmani Clark, 1990 c
 Anthonomus pecki Anderson, 2013 c g
 Anthonomus pedicularius (Linnaeus, C., 1758) c
 Anthonomus peninsularis Dietz, 1891 i c b
 Anthonomus perforator Porta, 1932 c
 Anthonomus peritus Clark in Clark & Burke, 1996 c
 Anthonomus persicae Hong, 2004 c
 Anthonomus pervilis Dietz, 1891 c
 Anthonomus philocola Dejean, 1821 c g
 Anthonomus phoradendrae Anderson, 1994 c
 Anthonomus phyllocola (Herbst, J.F.W., 1795) c
 Anthonomus phymosiae Burke, 1979 c
 Anthonomus picipes Blatchley, 1928 c
 Anthonomus pictus Blatchley, 1922 i c
 Anthonomus pimentai Clark, 1987 c
 Anthonomus pinivorax Silfverberg, 1977 c g
 Anthonomus pitangae Marshall, 1925 c
 Anthonomus plaga Clark, 1988 c
 Anthonomus planipennis Clark, 1993 c
 Anthonomus pomonae Germar, E.F., 1821 c
 Anthonomus pomonum Stephens, 1829 c
 Anthonomus pomorum (Linnaeus, C., 1758) c g
 Anthonomus possum Clark in Clark & Burke, 1996 c
 Anthonomus posthumus Suffrian, E., 1871 c
 Anthonomus postscutellatus Hustache, 1939 c
 Anthonomus potens Clark, 1992 c
 Anthonomus potestatis Clark, 1992 c
 Anthonomus praetextum Clark in Clark & Burke, 1993 c
 Anthonomus pravus Clark & Burke, 1985 c
 Anthonomus prodigiosus Clark, 1987 c
 Anthonomus profundus LeConte, 1876 i c b
 Anthonomus pruinosus Schenkling, S. & Marshall G.A.K., 1934 c
 Anthonomus pruni Desbrochers, J., 1868 c
 Anthonomus prunicida Walsh, 1863 c
 Anthonomus pruniphilus Chittenden, F.H., 1925 c
 Anthonomus pubescens Billberg, 1820 c
 Anthonomus pulchellus Suffrian, E., 1871 c
 Anthonomus pulicarius Boheman, 1843 c
 Anthonomus pumilae Brown, 1966 c
 Anthonomus pumilus Montrouzier, X., 1860 c
 Anthonomus pumorum (Linnaeus, 1758) i g
 Anthonomus puncticeps Champion, G.C., 1903 c
 Anthonomus punctipennis Gyllenhal, 1835 c
 Anthonomus pusillus LeConte, 1876 i c g b
 Anthonomus pusio Gyllenhal, 1835 c
 Anthonomus pustulatus Faust, J., 1893 c
 Anthonomus pyrenaeus Desbrochers, J., 1868 c
 Anthonomus pyri Chevrolat, 1844 c
 Anthonomus quadrigibbus Say, 1831 i c b  (apple curculio)
 Anthonomus quechpini Clark, 1988 c
 Anthonomus quesnelensis Sleeper, 1955 i c
 Anthonomus quisqueyensis Clark & Burke, 1985 c
 Anthonomus ratio Clark, 1994 c
 Anthonomus rectirostris (Linnaeus, C., 1758) c g
 Anthonomus recula Clark, 1993 c
 Anthonomus redtenbacheri Blackwelder, 1947 c
 Anthonomus reichardti Clark, 1992 c
 Anthonomus rhamphoides Suffrian, E., 1871 c
 Anthonomus rhinozote Clark, 1988 c
 Anthonomus rileyi  c b
 Anthonomus riparius Clark, 1989 c
 Anthonomus roberti Wencker, 1858 c
 Anthonomus robinsoni Blatchley & Leng, 1916 c
 Anthonomus robustulus LeConte, 1876 i c b
 Anthonomus rodriguezi Schenkling, S. & Marshall G.A.K., 1934 c
 Anthonomus rohweri Wickham, H.F., 1912 c g
 Anthonomus rosadonetoi Clark, 1987 c
 Anthonomus rosarum Daniel, K., 1899 c
 Anthonomus rosinae Gozis, M des, 1882 c
 Anthonomus rostrum Schenkling, S. & Marshall G.A.K., 1934 c
 Anthonomus rotundicollis Schenkling, S. & Marshall G.A.K., 1934 c
 Anthonomus rubellus Bechstein, 1835 c
 Anthonomus rubens Dejean, 1821 c
 Anthonomus ruber Perris, E., 1857 c
 Anthonomus rubi Billberg, 1820 c g
 Anthonomus rubidus LeConte, 1876 i c b
 Anthonomus rubiginosus Schenkling, S. & Marshall G.A.K., 1934 c
 Anthonomus rubricosus Boheman, C.H., 1859 c
 Anthonomus rubricus Schenkling and Marshall, 1934 i c
 Anthonomus rubripes Gyllenhal, 1835 c
 Anthonomus rubromaculatus Desberger in Bechstein, 1835 c
 Anthonomus ruffoi Clark, 1987 c
 Anthonomus ruficollis Champion, G.C., 1903 c
 Anthonomus rufipennis LeConte, 1876 i c g b
 Anthonomus rufipes LeConte, 1876 i c b
 Anthonomus rufirostris Gyllenhal, 1835 c
 Anthonomus rufus Gyllenhal, 1835 c
 Anthonomus rupus Clark, 1988 c
 Anthonomus rutilus (Boheman, 1843) i b
 Anthonomus ryukyuensis Kojima & Morimoto, 1994 c
 Anthonomus sallei Burke, 1979 c
 Anthonomus salvini Burke, 1979 c
 Anthonomus sanborni  c b
 Anthonomus santacruzi Hustache
 Anthonomus santarosae Clark in Clark & Burke, 1986 c
 Anthonomus scabricollis Schenkling, S. & Marshall G.A.K., 1934 c
 Anthonomus schuhi Clark & Burke, 2005 c
 Anthonomus schwarzi  c b
 Anthonomus schönherri Desbrochers, J., 1868 c
 Anthonomus scutellaris Curtis, 1829 c
 Anthonomus scutellatus Gyllenhal, 1835 c
 Anthonomus seminodulosus Kojima & Idris, 2004 c
 Anthonomus sexguttatus Dietz, 1891 i c
 Anthonomus sextuberculatus Schenkling, S. & Marshall G.A.K., 1934 c
 Anthonomus sibiricus Desbrochers, J., 1868 c
 Anthonomus signatipennis Blanchard, E. in Gay, 1851 c
 Anthonomus signatus Say – strawberry bud weevil
 Anthonomus silentium Clark in Clark & Burke, 1996 c
 Anthonomus simiolus Blatchley, 1916 i c
 Anthonomus sine Clark, 1991 c
 Anthonomus singularis Burke, 1962 c
 Anthonomus sinicus Voss, 1958 c
 Anthonomus sisymbrii Hustache, 1939 c
 Anthonomus sisyphus Clark, 1987 c
 Anthonomus sobarus Clark, 1991 c
 Anthonomus sobrinus Faust, J., 1893 c
 Anthonomus solani Fall, 1913 i c
 Anthonomus solarii Champion, 1910 i c b
 Anthonomus soleatus Clark, 1993 c
 Anthonomus somniculosus Clark in Clark & Burke, 1996 c
 Anthonomus somnium Clark in Clark & Burke, 1996 c
 Anthonomus somnolentus Clark in Clark & Burke, 1996 c
 Anthonomus soporatus Clark in Clark & Burke, 1996 c
 Anthonomus soporis Clark in Clark & Burke, 1996 c
 Anthonomus soporus Scudder, S.H., 1890 c g
 Anthonomus sorbi Germar, E.F., 1821 c
 Anthonomus sparsus Boheman, C.H., 1859 c
 Anthonomus sphaeralciae Fall, 1913 i c b
 Anthonomus spilotus Redtenbacher, 1849 c
 Anthonomus spinipennis Hustache, 1930 c
 Anthonomus spinolae Boheman, 1843 c
 Anthonomus spinosus Kojima, 2010 c
 Anthonomus squamans Champion, 1903 i c g b
 Anthonomus squamoerectus Clark & Burke, 2005 c
 Anthonomus squamosus LeConte, 1876 i c b
 Anthonomus squamulatus Dietz, 1891 i c
 Anthonomus squamulosus Schenkling, S. & Marshall G.A.K., 1934 c
 Anthonomus staelena Clark, 1990 c
 Anthonomus stellatus Clark, 1993 c
 Anthonomus stierlini Desbrochers des Loges, J., 1869 c
 Anthonomus stigmaticollis Clark, 1993 c
 Anthonomus stigmosus Clark, 1993 c
 Anthonomus stockwelli Clark, 1987 c
 Anthonomus stolatus Fall, 1901 i c b
 Anthonomus strandi Stierlin, W.G., 1903 c
 Anthonomus strandiata Roubal, 1936 c
 Anthonomus strangulatus Faust, J., 1893 c
 Anthonomus stupor Clark in Clark & Burke, 1996 c
 Anthonomus stupulosus Schenkling, S. & Marshall G.A.K., 1934 c
 Anthonomus subchalybaeus Reitter, 1915 c
 Anthonomus subfasciatus LeConte, 1876 i c b
 Anthonomus subguttatus Dietz, 1891 i c
 Anthonomus sublatus Clark, 1991 c
 Anthonomus subparallelus Schenkling, S. & Marshall G.A.K., 1934 c
 Anthonomus subvittatus LeConte, 1876 i c
 Anthonomus sugillatus Clark, 1990 c
 Anthonomus sulcatus Kirsch, T., 1874 c
 Anthonomus sulcicollis Hustache, 1939 c
 Anthonomus sulcifrons LeConte, J.L., 1876 c
 Anthonomus sulcipygus Schenkling, S. & Marshall G.A.K., 1934 c
 Anthonomus summeri Hatch, 1971 i g
 Anthonomus sunchalensis Cockerell, T.D.A., 1925 c g
 Anthonomus superbus Clark, 1991 c
 Anthonomus suturalis LeConte, 1824 i c b
 Anthonomus suturatus  c
 Anthonomus suturellus Gyllenhal, 1835 c
 Anthonomus sycophanta Walsh, 1867 c
 Anthonomus tacarani Clark, 1990 c
 Anthonomus tahoensis Fall, 1901 i c
 Anthonomus takahashii Kojima & Morimoto, 1994 c
 Anthonomus tantillus Schenkling, S. & Marshall G.A.K., 1934 c
 Anthonomus tarquinius Clark, 1991 c
 Anthonomus teapensis Schenkling, S. & Marshall G.A.K., 1934 c
 Anthonomus tectus LeConte, 1876 i c b
 Anthonomus tenebrosus Boheman, 1843 c
 Anthonomus tenuicornis Schenkling, S. & Marshall G.A.K., 1934 c
 Anthonomus tenuis Fall, 1913 i c b
 Anthonomus terreus Gyllenhal, 1835 c
 Anthonomus tessellatus Walsh, 1866 c
 Anthonomus testaceosquamosus Linell, 1897 i c b
 Anthonomus testaceus Boheman, 1843 c
 Anthonomus texanus Dietz, 1891 i c b
 Anthonomus thurberiae Pierce, 1913 c
 Anthonomus thyasocnemoides Hustache, A., 1922 c
 Anthonomus thyasocnemoidus Hustache, 1930 c
 Anthonomus tibialis Hustache, 1940 c
 Anthonomus tigrinus Suffrian, E., 1871 c
 Anthonomus tomentosus Clark, 1987 c
 Anthonomus torpidus Clark in Clark & Burke, 1996 c
 Anthonomus townsendi Jones & Burke, 1997 c
 Anthonomus transliensis Ter-Minasian, 1936 c
 Anthonomus tremendus Clark, 1990 c
 Anthonomus triangularis Champion, 1910 c
 Anthonomus triangulifer Schenkling, S. & Marshall G.A.K., 1934 c
 Anthonomus trica Clark, 1993 c
 Anthonomus tricolor  c
 Anthonomus tricopis Clark, 1991 c
 Anthonomus tricuspis Clark, 1991 c
 Anthonomus tridens Fall, H.C., 1909 c
 Anthonomus triensis Clark, 1991 c
 Anthonomus tripugionis Clark, 1991 c
 Anthonomus trisicifer Clark, 1991 i c
 Anthonomus tuberculosus Faust, J., 1893 c
 Anthonomus tuberosus Gyllenhal, 1835 c
 Anthonomus uenoi Kojima & Morimoto, 1994 c
 Anthonomus ulmi Schoenherr, 1825 c
 Anthonomus undatus Clark, 1990 c
 Anthonomus undulatus Gyllenhal, 1835 c g
 Anthonomus ungularis LeConte, 1876 i c b
 Anthonomus unicolor Faust, J., 1890 c
 Anthonomus unicus Blatchley & Leng, 1916 c
 Anthonomus uniformis Faust, J., 1890 c
 Anthonomus unipustulatus Schenkling, S. & Marshall G.A.K., 1934 c b
 Anthonomus uniseriatus Champion, 1910 c
 Anthonomus univestis Schenkling and Marshall, 1934 i c
 Anthonomus univestris Voss, 1944 c
 Anthonomus v-notatus Schenkling, S. & Marshall G.A.K., 1934 c
 Anthonomus valentis Clark, 1992 c
 Anthonomus vanini Clark, 1987 c
 Anthonomus vanus Clark, 1991 c
 Anthonomus variabilis Philippi, 1864 c g
 Anthonomus varians Germar, 1817 c
 Anthonomus varicolor Gyllenhal, 1835 c
 Anthonomus variegatus Dejean, 1821 c
 Anthonomus varipes Jacquelin du Val, 1857 i c
 Anthonomus varius Schenkling, S. & Marshall G.A.K., 1934 c
 Anthonomus venustus Schenkling, S. & Marshall G.A.K., 1934 c
 Anthonomus veracruzensis Sleeper, 1958 c
 Anthonomus veraepacis Schenkling, S. & Marshall G.A.K., 1934 c
 Anthonomus verrucosus Suffrian, E., 1871 c
 Anthonomus vesculus Clark, 1993 c
 Anthonomus vespertinus Dietz, 1891 c
 Anthonomus vestitus Boheman, C.H., 1859 c
 Anthonomus veternosus Clark in Clark & Burke, 1996 c
 Anthonomus victim Clark, 1993 c
 Anthonomus villaticus Clark, 1990 c
 Anthonomus vinarius Clark, 1991 c
 Anthonomus virgo Dietz, 1891 c
 Anthonomus vis Clark, 1992 c
 Anthonomus vulpinus Dietz, 1891 c
 Anthonomus vulturiscus Clark & Burke, 1985 c
 Anthonomus werneri Clark, 1996 c
 Anthonomus whiteheadi Clark, 1991 c
 Anthonomus wickhami Clark, 1988 c
 Anthonomus wissadulae Burke, 1979 c
 Anthonomus xanthocnemus Dietz, 1891 i c b
 Anthonomus xanthopus Boheman, 1843 c
 Anthonomus xanthoxyli Linell, 1897 i c b
 Anthonomus xanthus Blatchley, 1925 c
 Anthonomus xantus Blatchley, W.S., 1925 c
 Anthonomus yarae Clark, 1990 c
 Anthonomus ylem Clark, 1991 c
 Anthonomus yoroi Kojima, 2010 c
 Anthonomus yuasi Kôno, 1939 c
 Anthonomus yucatanus Champion, G.C., 1903 c
 Anthonomus zagluli Clark & Burke, 1985 c
 Anthonomus zonarius Kirsch, T., 1874 c
 Anthonomus zunilensis Schenkling, S. & Marshall G.A.K., 1934 c
 Furcipus des Loges, 1868 g

Data sources: i = ITIS, c = Catalogue of Life, g = GBIF, b = Bugguide.net

References

Anthonomus